Sana Gulzar (born 20 January 1992) is a cricketer from Pakistan.

Career
Sana was selected to play in the 2010 Asian Games in China. Sana was selected to Pakistan's national squad for their serie 2011 Women's T20 Quadrangular series in Sri Lanka.

References

External links
 ESPN Cricinfo
 Cricket archive

1992 births
Living people
Pakistani women cricketers
Pakistan women One Day International cricketers
Cricketers at the 2010 Asian Games
Asian Games gold medalists for Pakistan
Asian Games medalists in cricket
Medalists at the 2010 Asian Games